The ET52 torpedo is the Chinese development of the Italian Alenia A244-S light ASW acoustic homing torpedo. It is considered by some to be an A244-S torpedo with technologies similar to a US Mk 46 Mod. 2 torpedo.

Development
China purchased around 40 Italian Alenia A244-S light ASW torpedoes in 1987 for evaluation and reverse engineering. At the time, China was in the process of working on the license production of the US Mk 46 Mod. 2 torpedo according to the deal first signed between China and the United States in 1985.

The 705th Institute (also known as Xi'an Precision Machinery Research Institute, 西安精密机械研究所), tasked to evaluate and reverse engineering the A244-S torpedo, was also responsible for Mk 46 Mod. 2 torpedo program in China, with many of the team members working on both projects. Chinese researchers suggested that since Otto fuel II powered torpedo could cost as much as three times an electrically powered torpedo, the cheaper electrically powered torpedo should be developed as well. The suggestion was accepted, and it was decided that the technologies of both the Mk 46 Mod. 2 torpedo and A244-S torpedo should be applied to each other to enhance their performances, and 705th Institute was put in charge of A244-S torpedo project in addition to the Mk 46 Mod. 2 torpedo project. Incorporating the features between torpedoes improved the performance of both torpedoes, with the largest benefit due to similar design and technology, which caused logistic support to be reduced alongside the cost. A derivative of ET52 has been exhibited at various defense exhibitions by China Shipbuilding Co., and this derivative uses Otto fuel instead of electricity.

See also
 Export torpedoes of China

References

Torpedoes of China